The Sligo Senior Hurling Championship is an annual Gaelic Athletic Association competition organised by Sligo GAA among the top hurling clubs in County Sligo. The winner qualifies to represent the county in the Connacht Junior Club Hurling Championship, the winner of which progresses to the All-Ireland Junior Club Hurling Championship. Previously, the winners used to compete in the Connacht Senior Club Hurling Championship but were very unsuccessful at that level.

Teams

2023 Teams

Roll of honour

Current format and teams
Today six teams play in the competition - Coolera/Standhill, Carly/St. Josephs, Western Gaels, Tourlestrane, Naoimh Eoin and Easkey Sea Blues. Craobh Rua were a team from Sligo town, but today the town now has two teams, Calry/St. Joseph's and Naoimh Eoin. Several amalgamations of hurling teams in Sligo have happened over the years.  Tubbercurry, Curry and Coolaney/Mullinabreena all play under Tourlestrane.  St. Farnan's play under Easkey Sea Blues or Western Gaels. Western Gaels comprise Enniscrone/Kilglass and Castleconnor.  Drumcliffe/Rosses Point and St Molaise Gaels play under Carly/St. Josephs.  

The competition is played in a group format with all teams playing each other and the top four qualifying for the semi-finals.

Finals listed by year

*Bold went on to win Connacht Junior Club Hurling Championship

References

External links
Official Sligo Website
Sligo on Hoganstand
Sligo Club GAA
Sligo GAA 125 History (2010)

Senior
Senior hurling county championships
Hurling Championship